Pseudomonas rubescens is a Gram-negative soil bacterium that was originally isolated from the oil in a machine shop. The type strain is ATCC 12099.

References

Pseudomonadales
Bacteria described in 1955